This is a list of notable people affiliated with the School of the Art Institute of Chicago or the Chicago Academy of Fine Arts.

Notable alumni

Animation 
 Walt Disney, animator, (Chicago Academy of Fine Arts)

Comics, cartoons

Designers 
 Charles C. Dawson, illustrator, book designer
 Robert E. Paige, designer
 Art Paul, graphic designer
 Norman Teague, designer
 Herbert Temple Jr., art director

Fashion

Filmmakers

Jewelers and light metal artists 
 Eileen Abdulrashid, artist, enameler

Illustrators

Painters

Photographers 
victor Skrebneski

Mixed media artists, multidisciplinary artists

New media artists, digital artists

Sculptors

Other

Notable faculty 

 Franco (Frank) Barsotti, Department of Photography
 Benjamin Bellas
 George Bellows (Chicago Academy of Fine Arts)
 Wafaa Bilal
Rika Burnham, Teaching Institute in Museum Education
Amanda Williams (artist)
 James Blomfield (Chicago Academy of Fine Arts)
 Stan Brakhage
 Christopher Bratton
 Nick Cave
 Francis Chapin
 Louis Grell
 Susanna Coffey
 John Rogers Cox
 Barbara Degenevieve
 James Elkins
 LaToya Ruby Frazier
 Michelle Grabner
 Diana Guerrero-Maciá
 Claudia Hart
 Tiffany Holmes
 Eduardo Kac
 Max Kahn
 Adelheid Mers
 Ayanah Moor
 Phil Morton
 Joyce Neimanas 
 Kamau Amu Patton, multidisciplinary artist
 Claire Pentecost
 Frank Piatek
 Jefferson Pinder
 Jaume Plensa
 Albin Polasek, sculptor
 Barbara Rossi, painter, original member of the Chicago Imagists
 Jerry Saltz
 David Sedaris
 Sonia Sheridan, artist, founder of Generative Systems: Art Science and Technology Department
 Lorado Taft, sculptor
 Ruth VanSickle Ford (Chicago Academy of Fine Arts)
 James F. Walker
 Mechtild Widrich
 Anne Wilson
 Karl Wirsum
 Ray Yoshida

References
Matthew Angelo Harrison

School of the Art Institute of Chicago
Art Institute of Chicago